Dingle CBS (Meánscoil na mBráithre Críostaí in Irish) was a secondary School in the County Kerry town of Dingle. It opened in 1846 by the Christian Brothers. The school  closed at the end of the 2006/07 school year.

Notable past pupils

Recent Kerry Footballers: Marc, Tomás and Darragh Ó Sé, Tommy Griffin, Diarmuid Murphy, Rónán Ó Flatharta
Former Kerry Footballers: Aodán Mac Gearailt, Dara Ó Cinnéide, Páidí Ó Sé

Others: Micheál Ó Muircheartaigh Gaa Commentator 
Joe Higgins Socialist Party Teachta dala

1846 establishments in Ireland
Congregation of Christian Brothers secondary schools in the Republic of Ireland
Dingle
Educational institutions established in 1846
Secondary schools in County Kerry